Aptychotrema is a genus of guitarfish, belonging to the family Rhinobatidae. They are found around Australia.

Species
There are three living species, and one extinct species only known from fossil remains of Cenomanian age.

 †Aptychotrema massoniae Bernardez, 2002
 Aptychotrema rostrata Shaw, 1794 (Eastern shovelnose ray or Short-snouted shovelnose ray) - synonym: Aptychotrema bougainvillii J. P. Müller & Henle, 841
 Aptychotrema timorensis Last, 2004 (Spotted shovelnose ray)
 Aptychotrema vincentiana Haacke, 1885 (Western shovelnose ray)

References

 
Trygonorrhinidae
 
Taxa named by John Roxborough Norman
Taxonomy articles created by Polbot